John McInnis Centre is a public high school in the Prince George, British Columbia part of School District 57 Prince George.

History
John McInnis Secondary was built in 1973 to fill the growing needs of the west side of the city. In 1973, the staff and students made a symbolic trek from Lakewood Junior Secondary where they had been on shift, to their brand new quarters at John McInnis. The School District honoured the pioneering spirit of John McInnis, who died in March 1972, by naming the new school after him.

Demographics
John McInnis is the Centre for Learning Alternatives in the Central Interior. Students come from a broad range of socioeconomic and racial groups. It offers Distance Education, Continuing Education (Adult Education), as well as many off-site programs to help students in Prince George.

Sports

Boys
 1997 "AA" Junior Basketball Provincial Champions
 2005 "AA" Junior Basketball Provincial Finalists
 2006 "AA" Junior Basketball Provincial Champions
 2009 "AA" Junior Basketball Provincial Finalists
 2003 "AA" Junior Volleyball Provincial Champions
 2004 "AA" Junior Volleyball Provincial Finalists
 2007 "AA" Junior Volleyball Provincial Champions
 2009 "AA" Junior Volleyball Provincial Champions

Girls
 1992 "AA" Junior Volleyball Provincial Finalists
 1993 "AA" Junior Volleyball Provincial Finalists

External links 
 John McInnis home page
 School Districts Website

High schools in Prince George, British Columbia
Educational institutions established in 1973
1973 establishments in British Columbia